HMS Greyhound was a member of the Gibraltar Group of 24-gun sixth rates. After commissioning she spent her career in Home waters and the Mediterranean on trade protection duties. She was captured by five Spanish warships off Morocco in 1718 then recaptured in 1719 and burnt.

Greyhound was the eighth named vessel since it was used for a 45-gun ship launched at Deptford in 1545, rebuilt 1558 and wrecked in 1563 off the Rye.

Construction
She was ordered on 9 October 1711 from Woolwich Dockyard to be built under the guidance of Jacob Acworth, Master Shipwright of Woolwich. She was launched on 21 June 1712. She was completed for sea on 15 July 1712.

Commissioned Service
She was commissioned in 1712 under the command of Commander Thomas Marwood, RN (promoted to captain in January 1713) for service at Minorca. She moved to the English Channel for 1715 thru 1717. In 1718 she was under the command of Commander John Cundett, RN for service off Sale, Morocco.

Loss
HMS Greyhound was captured by five Spanish warships in St Jerome's Bay, near Cape Spartel, Morocco on 5 September 1718. She was retaken on 16 September 1719 and burnt.

Citations

References
 Winfield 2009, British Warships in the Age of Sail (1603 – 1714), by Rif Winfield, published by Seaforth Publishing, England © 2009, EPUB , Chapter 6, The Sixth Rates, Vessels acquired from 2 May 1660, Gibraltar Group, Greyhound
 Winfield 2007, British Warships in the Age of Sail (1714 – 1792), by Rif Winfield, published by Seaforth Publishing, England © 2007, EPUB , Chapter 6, Sixth Rates, Sixth Rates of 20 or 24 guns, Vessels in Service at 1 August 1714, Gibraltar Group, Greyhound
 Colledge, Ships of the Royal Navy, by J.J. Colledge, revised and updated by Lt Cdr Ben Warlow and Steve Bush, published by Seaforth Publishing, Barnsley, Great Britain, © 2020, EPUB , (EPUB), Section G (Greyhound)

 

1710s ships
Corvettes of the Royal Navy
Ships built in Portsmouth
Naval ships of the United Kingdom